Elliot William Watt (born 11 March 2000) is a professional footballer who plays as a midfielder for  club Salford City.

Watt began his career in the youth academies of Liverpool, Blackburn Rovers, Preston North End, and Wolverhampton Wanderers. With Wolves, he made his professional debut, and spent time on loan at Carlisle United. He signed for Bradford City in 2020, spending two years with the club before departing for Salford.

Born in Preston, Watt has represented Scotland internationally for the U17s, U19s, and U21s, and participated in the 2018 Toulon Tournament.

Club career

Early career
Watt began his career at Liverpool before moving to Blackburn Rovers due to travelling problems. He then moved to hometown club Preston North End. He signed his first professional contract with Wolverhampton Wanderers in November 2017.

He made his Wolves debut on 28 August 2018 in the EFL Cup against Sheffield Wednesday at Hillsborough, starting in the 2–0 second round win.

On 1 January 2020, Watt joined Carlisle United on loan until the end of the season. His first appearance for the club was in a 2–2 draw against Cardiff City in the FA Cup, playing the full 90 minutes.

Bradford City
On 27 July 2020, Watt joined League Two side Bradford City on a two-year deal for an undisclosed fee. In November 2020 he was one of a number of young Bradford City players playing in the first team who were praised by manager Stuart McCall. He was one of seven players offered a new contract by Bradford City at the end of the 2021–22 season.

Salford City
On 27 June 2022, it was announced that he would sign for fellow League Two side Salford City, signing a two-year contract.

International career
While aged 18, Watt was selected by head coach Scot Gemmill to the Scotland U21 squad for the 2018 Toulon Tournament. The team lost to Turkey in a penalty-out and finished fourth.

Career statistics

References

External links

2000 births
Living people
Footballers from Preston, Lancashire
English footballers
Scottish footballers
Scotland youth international footballers
Scotland under-21 international footballers
Association football midfielders
Wolverhampton Wanderers F.C. players
Carlisle United F.C. players
Bradford City A.F.C. players
Salford City F.C. players
English people of Scottish descent